Guelph General Hospital is a medical care facility in Guelph, Ontario, Canada. It is a 182-bed facility with a total staff of about 1600.
The facility opened as a 12-bed unit on 16 August 1875.

This hospital rated as one of the safest in Canada in terms of the hospital standardized mortality ratio (the lower the better) at 78 in 2017, compared to the national average of 91. Also in 2017, the facility was among the best in Ontario in terms of wait times at the Emergency department.

References

External links
Guelph General Hospital
The Foundation of Guelph General Hospital at Canada Revenue Agency
 

Hospitals in Ontario
Hospitals established in 1875
Buildings and structures in Guelph